Kani Bazar Rural District is in Khalifan District of Mahabad County, West Azerbaijan province, Iran. At the National Census of 2006, its population was 10,199 in 1,555 households. There were 8,910 inhabitants in 1,572 households at the following census of 2011. At the most recent census of 2016, the population of the rural district was 7,801 in 2,224 households. The largest of its 45 villages was Kani Sib, with 380 people.

References 

Mahabad County

Rural Districts of West Azerbaijan Province

Populated places in West Azerbaijan Province

Populated places in Mahabad County